Abdulla Al-Haji (born December 5, 1990) is a tennis player from Qatar. He played an Association of Tennis Professionals (ATP) tournament at the 2008 Qatar Open, where he fell to Michael Berrer. He again participated in the 2010 Qatar Open, where he lost to Olivier Rochus.

External links
Profile on Yahoo! Sports

Living people
Qatari male tennis players
Tennis players at the 2006 Asian Games
1990 births
Place of birth missing (living people)
Asian Games competitors for Qatar